The men's light heavyweight (81 kilograms) event at the 2010 Asian Games took place from 17 to 25 November 2010 at Lingnan Mingzhu Gymnasium, Foshan, China.

Like all Asian Games boxing events, the competition was a straight single-elimination tournament. A total of 12 men from 12 countries competed in this event, limited to fighters whose body weight was less than 81 kilograms.

All bouts consisted of three three-minute rounds. The boxers receive points for every successful punch they land on their opponent's head or upper body. The boxer with the most points at the end of the bouts wins.

Elshod Rasulov of Uzbekistan won the gold medal. He beat Dinesh Kumar from India 10–4 on points in the final bout at the Foshan Gymnasium in Guangzhou. Deepak Maharjan of Nepal and Meng Fanlong from China shared the bronze medal after losing in the semifinal.

Deepak Maharjan's bronze medal was Nepal's only medal in the Games.

Schedule
All times are China Standard Time (UTC+08:00)

Results

References

External links
Official website

Men's 081